The One She Loved is a 1912 American silent drama film directed by  D. W. Griffith. The film, by the Biograph Company, was shot in Fort Lee, New Jersey when many early film studios in America's first motion picture industry were based there at the beginning of the 20th century.

Cast
 Henry B. Walthall as The Husband
 Mary Pickford as The Wife
 Lionel Barrymore as The Neighbor
 Kate Bruce as The Neighbor's Wife
 Gertrude Bambrick as The Stenographer
 Madge Kirby as The Nurse
 Harry Carey as The Neighbor's Friend
 Lillian Gish
 Eldean Stuart as The Baby

See also
 Harry Carey filmography
 D. W. Griffith filmography
 Lillian Gish filmography
 Lionel Barrymore filmography

References

External links

1912 films
1912 drama films
1912 short films
Films directed by D. W. Griffith
Films shot in Fort Lee, New Jersey
American silent short films
American black-and-white films
Silent American drama films
1910s American films